This is a list of films shot in Harlem, in New York City.

 Moon Over Harlem, 1939
 Paradise in Harlem, 1939
 Hi De Ho, 1947
 In the Street, 1948
 The Cool World, 1963
 The Pawnbroker, 1964
 Topaz, 1969
Harlem School 1970, 1970
 Cotton Comes to Harlem, 1970
 Black Roots, 1970
 Shaft, 1971
 Across 110th Street, 1972
 Come Back, Charleston Blue, 1972
 Shaft's Big Score, 1972
 Super Fly, 1972
 Black Caesar, 1973
 Ganja & Hess, 1973
 Gordon's War, 1973
 Hell Up in Harlem, 1973
 Live and Let Die, 1973
 Claudine, 1974
 Aaron Loves Angela, 1975
 The Brother from Another Planet, 1984
 The Cotton Club, 1984
 Looking for Langston, 1988
 Harlem Nights, 1989
 King of New York, 1990
 Paris Is Burning, 1990
 Reversal of Fortune, 1990 (City College of New York in Harlem, was used to depict Harvard University.)
 Strictly Business, 1991
 A Rage in Harlem, 1991
 New Jack City, 1991
 Jungle Fever, 1991
 Juice, 1992
 Who's the Man?, 1993
 Sugar Hill, 1994
 Above the Rim, 1994
 A Great Day in Harlem, 1994
 Die Hard with a Vengeance, 1995
 New Jersey Drive, 1995
 The Royal Tenenbaums, 2001
 Paid in Full, 2002
 25th Hour, 2002 (scenes filmed in Shepard Hall, City College of New York)
 The Hebrew Hammer, 2003 (scene filmed under the 125th Street viaduct)
 Killa Season, 2006
 August Rush, 2007
 Pride and Glory, 2007
 American Gangster, 2007
 The Ministers, 2007
 The Brave One, 2007
 Precious, 2009
 NYC 22, 2011 (TV series)
 Kill Your Darlings, 2012 (filmed on Astor Row)
The Secret Life of Walter Mitty, 2012
Monica Z, 2012
Black Nativity, 2013
Annie, 2014
Harlemites, 2017 (Film series)

References 

Harlem
Harlem
Films shot in New York City